In quantum field theory, and especially in quantum electrodynamics, the interacting theory leads to infinite quantities that have to be absorbed in a renormalization procedure, in order to be able to predict measurable quantities. The renormalization scheme can depend on the type of particles that are being considered. For particles that can travel asymptotically large distances, or for low energy processes, the on-shell scheme, also known as the physical scheme, is appropriate. If these conditions are not fulfilled, one can turn to other schemes, like the minimal subtraction scheme (MS scheme).

Fermion propagator in the interacting theory

Knowing the different propagators is the basis for being able to calculate Feynman diagrams which are useful tools to predict, for example, the result of scattering experiments. In a theory where the only field is the Dirac field, the Feynman propagator reads

where  is the time-ordering operator,  the vacuum in the non interacting theory,  and  the Dirac field and its Dirac adjoint, and where the left-hand side of the equation is the two-point correlation function of the Dirac field.

In a new theory, the Dirac field can interact with another field, for example with the electromagnetic field in quantum electrodynamics, and the strength of the interaction is measured by a parameter, in the case of QED it is the bare electron charge, . The general form of the propagator should remain unchanged, meaning that if  now represents the vacuum in the interacting theory, the two-point correlation function would now read

Two new quantities have been introduced. First the renormalized mass  has been defined as the pole in the Fourier transform of the Feynman propagator. This is the main prescription of the on-shell renormalization scheme (there is then no need to introduce other mass scales like in the minimal subtraction scheme). The quantity  represents the new strength of the Dirac field.

Thus these parameters can be expressed as

On the other hand, the modification to the propagator can be calculated up to a certain order in  using Feynman diagrams. These modifications are summed up in the fermion self energy 

These corrections are often divergent because they contain loops.

Photon propagator

The photon self energy is noted  and the metric tensor  (here taking the +--- convention)

The behaviour of the counterterm  is independent of the momentum of the incoming photon . To fix it, the behaviour of QED at large distances (which should help recover classical electrodynamics), i.e. when , is used :

Vertex function

A similar reasoning using the vertex function leads to the renormalization of the electric charge . This renormalization, and the fixing of renormalization terms is done using what is known from classical electrodynamics at large space scales. This leads to the value of the counterterm , which is, in fact, equal to  because of the Ward–Takahashi identity. It is this calculation that account for the anomalous magnetic dipole moment of fermions.

Rescaling of the QED Lagrangian

We have considered some proportionality factors (like the ) that have been defined from the form of the propagator. However they can also be defined from the QED Lagrangian, which will be done in this section, and these definitions are equivalent. The Lagrangian that describes the physics of quantum electrodynamics is

where  is the field strength tensor,  is the Dirac spinor (the relativistic equivalent of the wavefunction), and  the electromagnetic four-potential. These quantities happen to be infinite due to loop corrections (see below). One can define the renormalized quantities (which will be finite and observable):

The  are called counterterms (some other definitions of them are possible). They are supposed to be small in the parameter . The Lagrangian now reads in terms of renormalized quantities (to first order in the counterterms):

A renormalization prescription is a set of rules that describes what part of the divergences should be in the renormalized quantities and what parts should be in the counterterms.

References

 
 
 

Quantum field theory
Renormalization group